Fallowfield Township is an unincorporated community in Washington County, Pennsylvania, United States. It was the sixth township to be established after the 1781 formation of Washington County, and initially stretched from Elrama (north) to the Ten Mile Creek in what are, today, Union and East Bethlehem townships on the Monongahela River. Home to the John H. Nelson House, which was built circa 1895, this township was gradually downsized as various sections were sectioned off into new municipalities (Allen, Carroll, Pike Run, and Somerset townships and the borough of Charleroi). Now roughly 21.3 square miles in size, its population was 4,300, according to the 2010 U.S. Census.

Notable places
 John H. Nelson House: Built circa 1895, this two-story, Queen Anne, red brick farmhouse is located at 104 Colvin Road in Fallowfield Township. Designed by architect William H. Riggle, it was built by contractor H. A. Hannen for John H. Nelson, who was a son of Irish immigrant Francis Nelson.

References

Unincorporated communities in Washington County, Pennsylvania
Unincorporated communities in Pennsylvania